Akib ibn Usaid, a sahaba of Muhammad, was the first governor of Mecca. It was the first permanent civil appointment made in Islam. Akib took charge of his duties as governor of Mecca in January 630.

See also
 Family tree of Akib ibn Usaid

External links
 Restatement of History of Islam and Muslims

Year of birth missing
Year of death missing
Companions of the Prophet